The Battle of Craon took place between 21–24 May 1592, between the French Royal army under the Duke of Montpensier and François de Bourbon, Prince of Conti, reinforced by English contingents under Sir John Norreys, against the combined forces of Spain, during their occupation of Brittany, and the Catholic League of France during the War of the Three Henrys and the Anglo-Spanish War (1585–1604), in the context of the French Wars of Religion. Craon was besieged by the army of Henry of Navarre, but the defenders, supported by a Catholic relief force recruited by Philippe Emmanuel, Duke of Mercœur, resisted. At the end, Craon was relieved by the Spaniards under Don Juan del Águila, who defeated the Anglo-French besiegers.

Background
The commander of the Catholic League of France in the region, the Duke of Mercœur, Governor of Brittany, ordered his chief lieutenant, Urbain de Laval Boisdauphin, to strengthen Craon. In 1590, Mercœur rebelled against the accession to the throne of France of Henry of Navarre and became the head of the Catholic League of Brittany, aiming to restore the autonomy of the former Duchy, and proclaimed protector of the Catholic Church in the region of Brittany.

The Duke of Mercœur had the support of the Catholic King, Philip II of Spain, who sent him 7,000 Spanish soldiers who landed at Blavet (Port Louis) under the command of Don Juan del Águila.

On 8 February 1592, Henry of Navarre decided to take the city of Craon. His cousins, the Duke of Montpensier and François de Bourbon, Prince de Conti, secretly gathered together in Laval to organise the attack. Montpensier arrived with his army on 14 April 1592 and laid siege to the town. He was aided by 1,200 English led by Anthony Wingfield (in John Norreys' absence) and 800 German mercenaries. Then on 20 May 1592, Mercœur and Sablé arrived with their armies to defend Craon.

Battle of Craon
The defense of the city of Craon by the Catholic troops against the French troops of Montpensier and Conti was fierce. On 22 May 1592 the Spanish-Catholic army reached Craon under Don Juan del Águila and the Duke of Mercœur. The Spanish-Catholic troops charged against the left flank, taking by surprise the Anglo-French besiegers. At the same time the besieged angrily attacked the right flank, finally achieving a brilliant victory. Under cover of night, Montpensier retired to Laval and Rennes.

The Spaniards captured all the artillery, ammunition carts, flags, equipment, and supplies from the enemy. The English soldiers captured were not given quarter, and were all executed, in part in retaliation for the cruelty received from the English on the wrecks of the Spanish Armada.

Aftermath

Jérôme d'Arradon, a French commander, who was entrusted with the command of Hennebont and Blavet by Mercœur, quickly realized that the Spaniards behaved as their conquerors and did not recognize any authority other than their King, Philip of Spain.

Just a few days later, Laval fell in the hands of the Catholic League. On 23 May 1592 the Prince of Conti retreated into the Chateau-Gontier. The Duke Mercœur and the Marquis of Sablé entered into Laval and took the Chateau-Gontier. Boisdauphin took command of Laval, and Louis Champagné became Governor of Chateau-Gontier.

See also
 Catholic League
 Brittany
 Duchy of Brittany
 Edict of Nantes
 War of the Three Henrys
 French Wars of Religion

Notes

References
 Pierre Miquel. Les Guerres de Religion. Club France Loisirs (1980) 
 Abbé Angot. Un soldat catholique de la bataille de Craon (23 May 1592). 1896. .  
 Martínez Laínez, Fernando/Sánchez de Toca, José María. Tercios de España. La infantería legendaria. Editorial EDAF 2006. 
 
 
 
 
 John S Nolan. Sir John Norreys and the Elizabethan Military World (University of Exeter. 1997) 
 Chisholm, Hugh. Edition (1911). Encyclopædia Britannica (Eleventh ed.). Cambridge University Press.

Battles involving France
Battles involving Spain
Battles involving England
History of Catholicism in France
Battles of the French Wars of Religion
Conflicts in 1592
1592 in France
Battles in Pays de la Loire
History of Mayenne